For Scent-imental Reasons is a 1949 Warner Bros. Looney Tunes short directed by Chuck Jones and written by Michael Maltese. The short was released on November 12, 1949, and stars Pepé Le Pew and Penelope Pussycat.

It won the Academy Award for Best Animated Short Film in 1949 and was the first Chuck Jones-directed cartoon and the second Warner Bros. Cartoons to win this award (after Tweetie Pie won in 1947).

Plot
The owner of a perfume shop in Paris is shocked to find Pepé Le Pew testing the wares inside his shop. He seeks help from a strong and powerful gendarme, but the gendarme is repulsed by Pepé's odor and runs away. The shop owner notices Penelope Pussycat and flings her into the store, demanding that she "remove that polecat pole from the premises." Penelope hits a desk, causing a bottle of white dye to spill and run down her back and tail. Pepé immediately mistakes her for a female skunk and falls madly in love with her.

The cat smells Pepé's odor and immediately tries to run away, chased by Pepé. As she attempts to wiggle free from Pepé's embrace, he makes comments like, "It is love at sight first, no?" and "We will make beautiful music together." She breaks free and attempts to wash the stripe and the smell off, but is unsuccessful, with Pepé assuming she is making herself dainty. She runs to a window and tries to open it, but it is stuck, with Pepé thinking she is seeking a "tristing place" for them. She finally takes refuge inside a locked glass cabinet, much to Pepé's chagrin. Pepé first tries to lure her out sweetly, then demands that she come out of the cabinet. She refuses, indicating that it is due to his odor. Pepé Le Pew becomes saddened, pulls out a gun, walks out of sight and fires the weapon, presumably killing himself. Panicked, the cat rushes out, only to run directly into Pepé's arms. He tells her, "I missed, fortunately for you." The chase continues until Pepé finds the cat on the windowsill. He believes she is trying to prove her love for him by committing suicide, and declares that he will save her. Pepé grabs for her, but she slips through his arms. Pepé then calls out: "Vive l'amour, we die together" and steps off the window ledge. The cat falls into a barrel of water under a rain-spout off-screen, while Pepé lands in a can of blue paint.

The water washes the white stripe off Penelope and gives her a cold that prevents her from smelling his odor. When Pepé climbs out, he is blue. He sees the ragged-looking, sneezing wet cat but does not recognize her. He wanders off to find the "beautiful young lady skunk." The soaked black cat watches his blue muscular form walking away and she falls for him. When Pepé goes back into the perfume shop to look for the female skunk, he hears the door shut and the lock click behind him. When he turns, he sees the drenched female cat leering at him and begins to panic, realizing that he is now the victim of love. She drops the key to the lock down her neckline as the startled Pepé says, "Oh, no!" and runs away. As Pepé runs as fast as he can, the cat follows using Pepé's familiar hopping pace. The short ends with Pepé telling the audience: "You know? It is possible to be too attractive," while continuing to run.

Notes
In 1957, this cartoon was reissued as a Blue Ribbon Merrie Melodies. However, like all cartoons reissued between 1956 and 1959, the opening title (The Merry-Go-Round Broke Down) music still plays and the original ending title was kept.

Home media
This cartoon can be seen with the Blue Ribbon reissue on the first volume of the Looney Tunes Golden Collection: Volume 1 DVD set (disc 3) and Warner Bros. Home Entertainment Academy Awards Animation Collection (disc 1). In 2011, it also appeared in Looney Tunes Super Stars' Pepe Le Pew: Zee Best of Zee Best and Looney Tunes Platinum Collection: Volume 1.
The oft-censored glass case/suicide sequence was used in both the Chuck Jones compilation movie The Bugs Bunny/Road Runner Movie and Chuck Amuck: The Movie, though in the former, the scene with Penelope attempting to wash the stripe off her back is left out.
This short was featured on the UK Rental VHS release of Singles

See also
"(I Love You) For Sentimental Reasons", the song for which the cartoon is named.

References

External links

1949 films
1949 animated films
1949 short films
1940s Warner Bros. animated short films
Best Animated Short Academy Award winners
Short films directed by Chuck Jones
Animated films set in Paris
Looney Tunes shorts
Films scored by Carl Stalling
Animated films about cats
1949 romantic comedy films
American romantic comedy films
Penelope Pussycat films
Pepé Le Pew films
Films with screenplays by Michael Maltese